Esta TerBlanche (born 7 January 1973) is a South African actress, best known for her roles on television soap operas in both South Africa and the United States.

Early life
TerBlanche was born in Rustenburg, North West Province. She is of Huguenot descent. She grew up on a game farm, replete with monkeys, cows, horses, sheep, warthogs, and elams.

Television
TerBlanche was crowned Miss Teen South Africa in 1991, and subsequently played Bienkie Naudé Hartman on the South African drama Egoli: Place of Gold from 1992 to 1995. In 1995, TerBlanche decided not to renew her contract with Egoli and, instead, opted to further her acting career in the U.S. Within three weeks of arriving in Los Angeles, she found her first job, acting in a hair products commercial. In 1997, TerBlanche was cast in the role of Gillian Andrassy on the American daytime drama All My Children. Gillian, a troublemaking princess, was killed off in 2001 as TerBlanche asked to be written out of the show to move back to South Africa.

TerBlanche made a guest appearance on Egoli: Place of Gold in 2004. She also made additional appearances on South African TV and in movies, but later returned to the United States.  In 2010, she was interviewed by the American magazine Soap Opera Digest. She reported then that she had divorced and taken a break from acting. She stated that she had opened a spa, exploring her interest in the medical field and in healing. 
In the interview, TerBlanche also noted that she had begun acting again and had recently filmed a pilot in South Africa. She expressed interest in returning to All My Children or acting in another soap, citing her time on All My Children as the best of her life. In 2011, she was briefly profiled in the People magazine tribute to All My Children. In August 2011, it was announced that TerBlanche would reprise the role of Gillian during the final weeks of All My Children'''s broadcast on American network television. TerBlanche made a guest appearance on the show on 24 August 2011.

Plays she has appeared in include: The Glass Menagerie, Pygmalion, Hear Ye, and Ten Times Worse on Friday. She also starred in the film, Three Thieves and a Wedding. TerBlanche also worked as a TV presenter in South Africa for the environmental program 50/50 and the children's show, K-T.V.'' TerBlanche is well known in South Africa and has appeared on the covers of many magazines.

Personal life
A native speaker of Afrikaans, TerBlanche also speaks English and German fluently, and can speak French, Italian, and Russian with varying levels of fluency. TerBlanche was married to André Kock from 1997 to 2008, when they divorced.

References

External links

1973 births
Living people
People from Rustenburg
Afrikaner people
South African soap opera actresses
American soap opera actresses
20th-century South African actresses
21st-century South African actresses
21st-century American women